Robert Molloy (9 July 1936 – 2 October 2016) was an Irish politician who served as Minister of State for Housing and Urban Renewal and Minister of State to the Government from 1997 to 2002, Minister for Energy from 1989 to 1992, Minister for Defence from 1977 to 1979, Minister for Local Government from 1970 to 1973, Parliamentary Secretary to the Minister for Education from 1969 to 1970 and Mayor of Galway from 1968 to 1969. He served as a Teachta Dála (TD) for the Galway West constituency from 1965 to 2002.

Molloy was born in Galway and was educated at Coláiste Iognáid and University College Galway. Molloy was first elected to Dáil Éireann as a Fianna Fáil TD for the Galway West constituency at the 1965 general election. In 1968, he was also elected Mayor of Galway. The following year he was appointed to the Cabinet as Parliamentary Secretary to the Minister for Education. From 1970 to 1973, he served as Minister for Local Government. When Fianna Fáil returned to power in 1977, he became Minister for Defence in the final government of Jack Lynch.

In 1979, Molloy supported George Colley in the Fianna Fáil leadership contest. However, Charles Haughey was the eventual victor. After this Molloy was dropped from the Cabinet, becoming a member of the Gang of 22 who opposed Haughey's leadership of the party. In 1986, Molloy resigned from Fianna Fáil and joined the newly formed Progressive Democrats. In 1989, the party entered into coalition with Fianna Fáil, with Molloy becoming Minister for Energy. That same year he contested the European Parliament elections but was unsuccessful in his attempt. He stood at the European Parliament elections again in 1994, but was again unsuccessful. Following the 1997 general election, Molloy helped in the negotiations for forming the coalition government between the Progressive Democrats and Fianna Fáil. On that occasion he became Minister of State at the Department of the Environment.

Molloy retired from politics just before the 2002 general election amid controversy regarding constituency letters intervening in the rape case of Barbara Naughton.

References

Sources
Henry, William (2002). Role of Honour: The Mayors of Galway City 1485-2001. Galway: Galway City Council.  

1936 births
2016 deaths
Alumni of the University of Galway
Fianna Fáil TDs
Mayors of Galway
Members of the 18th Dáil
Members of the 19th Dáil
Members of the 20th Dáil
Members of the 21st Dáil
Members of the 22nd Dáil
Members of the 23rd Dáil
Members of the 24th Dáil
Members of the 25th Dáil
Members of the 26th Dáil
Members of the 27th Dáil
Members of the 28th Dáil
Ministers for Defence (Ireland)
Ministers of State of the 28th Dáil
Parliamentary Secretaries of the 19th Dáil
Local councillors in County Galway
Local councillors in Galway (city)
Politicians from County Galway
Progressive Democrats TDs